Romain Ferrier (born 24 February 1976) is a retired French footballer who played as a defender.

His previous clubs include AS Cannes, Bordeaux, Montpellier HSC and Guingamp. He also played in Europe with Bordeaux and Montpellier and had a spell in Greece with Skoda Xanthi.

Honours
Bordeaux
Division 1 champions: 1998–99

Montpellier
UEFA Intertoto Cup: 1999

Chamois Niortais
Championnat National champions: 2005–06

References

1976 births
Living people
Sportspeople from Cannes
French footballers
Association football defenders
AS Cannes players
FC Girondins de Bordeaux players
Montpellier HSC players
En Avant Guingamp players
Ciudad de Murcia footballers
Chamois Niortais F.C. players
Xanthi F.C. players
Ligue 1 players
Ligue 2 players
Championnat National players
Footballers from Provence-Alpes-Côte d'Azur